A partial list of the some 250 islands of the Republic of Palau, located in the western Caroline Islands Archipelago. The islands are within the Micronesia region of Oceania, in the western Pacific Ocean.

Inhabited

Uninhabited 

Chomedokl
Chouwid
Eil Malk
Kuabeserrai
Mchochaeo
Merir
Ngelsibel
Ngkesill
Ongael
Ongetkatel
Rock Islands
Bablomekang
Ngeanges
Ngerukewid
Ngeruktabel
Oilouch

See also

List of islands of the Federated States of Micronesia — of the central and western Caroline Islands Archipelago.
:Category:Caroline Islands 
Micronesia

 
Islands
Islands
Palau
Geography of Micronesia